Suantraí dá Mhac Tabhartha, also known as Lullaby to his Illegitimate Son is an Irish-language poem by Eoghan Rua Ó Súilleabháin (c. 1748 – 29 June 1782).

References
 An Leabhar Mòr/The Great Book of Gaelic, ed. Theo Dorgan and Malcolm Maclean, 2008.

18th-century Irish literature
Irish literature
Irish poems
Irish texts
Irish-language literature
18th-century poems